Fidel Antonio Vargas (born 28 July 1992) is a Cuban canoeist who won a silver medal in the K-2 200 m event at the 2015 Pan American Games, together with Reiner Torres. He competed in the individual 200 m at the 2016 Summer Olympics, but failed to reach the final.

References

External links
 

1992 births
Living people
Cuban male canoeists
Olympic canoeists of Cuba
Canoeists at the 2016 Summer Olympics
Pan American Games medalists in canoeing
Pan American Games silver medalists for Cuba
Canoeists at the 2015 Pan American Games
Medalists at the 2015 Pan American Games
Medalists at the 2019 Pan American Games
Sportspeople from Santiago de Cuba
20th-century Cuban people
21st-century Cuban people